The 2010 Rally of Turkey was the fourth round of the 2010 World Rally Championship season. The rally took place over April 16–18, and was based in the country's largest city, Istanbul. The rally was also the opening round of the Junior World Rally Championship.

The event was won by Sébastien Loeb, his third successive victory of the season and the 57th of his career.



Results

Event standings

Special stages

Standings after the rally

Drivers' Championship standings

Manufacturers' Championship standings

References

External links 
 Results at eWRC.com

Turkey
Rally of Turkey
Rally of Turkey
April 2010 sports events in Turkey